No. 1 Air Control Centre (also known as 1 ACC) is a deployable mobile command and control unit of the Royal Air Force that is currently based at RAF Scampton in Lincolnshire. The unit acts in conjunction with the Control and Reporting Centre (CRC) at RAF Boulmer in Northumberland, but also detaches staff to overseas locations when the Royal Air Force is engaged in operations. Some of these postings are permanent, such as in the Falklands Islands and at Cyprus.

1 ACC's remit is to protect the United Kingdom's, and deployed airspace, from hostile aircraft.

History
No. 1 Air Control Centre started out as No. 9 Signals Unit (9 SU) at RAF Rattlesden in Suffolk in 1964. A year later it was renamed as No. 1 Air Control Centre, and remained at Rattlesden. In 1967, it moved to RAF Wattisham, where it remained until 1979 until it moved to Nancekuke in Cornwall (later RAF Portreath and then RRH Portreath).

Between 2006 and 2009, No. 1 ACC was deployed to Afghanistan on Operation Herrick.

In 2008, plans were announced in Parliament to relocate 1 ACC from RAF Kirton in Lindsey and the CRC from Scampton to RAF Coningsby in Lincolnshire. Whilst this move did not proceed as intended, 1 ACC moved to RAF Scampton in 2012 and the technical site at RAF Kirton in Lindsey was sold off, although the domestic site was retained for RAF personnel.

In 2018, the RAF announced that RAF Scampton would close by 2022, which would involve moving all units out of the station to other locations. 1 ACC will move before the station closes to RAF Boulmer.

Staffing of the unit fluctuates with demand and role, but in 2015, the number of personnel at the unit was around 220.

Role
The main role of 1 ACC is to provide deployed air control operations, both in the United Kingdom and on deployed operations worldwide. Whilst working in the United Kingdom, 1 ACC feeds into the CRC at RAF Boulmer and helps to protect UK airspace from hostile aircraft.

Locations

Permanent locations

Current
RAF Scampton, (2013 – present)
Mount Olympus (Cyprus)
Mount Alice (Falklands)
Byron Heights (Falklands)
Mount Kent (Falklands)

Historical
RAF Rattlesden, (1965 – 1967)
RAF Wattisham, (1967 – 1979)
RAF Portreath, (1979 – 1982)
RAF Boulmer, (1995 – 2005)
RAF Kirton in Lindsey, (2005 – 2013)

Short deployments
Zambia, (1967)
Exercise Saif Sareea II, (2001)
Operation Telic, (2004)
Operation Herrick, (2006–2009)

References

Military units and formations of the Royal Air Force
Military units and formations disestablished in 1982
Military units and formations established in 1995